Gastone Calabresi (6 April 1886 – 19 June 1916) was an Italian gymnast. He competed in the men's team event at the 1908 Summer Olympics.

References

1886 births
1916 deaths
Italian male artistic gymnasts
Olympic gymnasts of Italy
Gymnasts at the 1908 Summer Olympics
Sportspeople from Ferrara